Jean Launay (born 24 July 1952) was a member of the National Assembly of France.  He represented 
Lot's 2nd constituency from 1998 to 2017, as a member of the Socialiste, radical, citoyen et divers gauche.

References

1952 births
Living people
Socialist Party (France) politicians
Deputies of the 12th National Assembly of the French Fifth Republic
Deputies of the 13th National Assembly of the French Fifth Republic
Deputies of the 14th National Assembly of the French Fifth Republic